We're All Christs (Wszyscy jesteśmy Chrystusami) is a 2006 Polish comedy-drama film directed by Marek Koterski. It is the seventh in a nine-part series of films about the character Adaś Miauczyński, created by Koterski. Each story showcases a different aspect or era of his life, often with little continuity between them.

We're All Christs focuses on the protagonist's alcohol addiction and his relationship with his son, Sylwuś, with emphasis on the way the father's alcoholism has caused lifelong trauma for the pair. Miauczyński is portrayed by two actors in the film, Marek Kondrat and Andrzej Chyra, each of whom embodies him at a different stage of his life.

Cast and characters
 Marek Kondrat as Adaś Miauczyński at 55
 Andrzej Chyra as Adaś Miauczyński at 33
 Michał Koterski as Sylwek
 Janina Traczykówna as Adaś's mother
 Małgorzata Bogdańska as Adaś's wife
 Tomasz Sapryk as guardian angel
 Marcin Dorociński as evil angel
 Andrzej Grabowski as Adaś's friend
 Marian Dziędziel as Adaś's friend
 Jan Frycz as Adaś's friend
 Artur Żmijewski as Adaś's friend
 Paweł Królikowski as Adaś's friend
 Andrzej Zieliński as Adaś's friend
 Ewa Ziętek as Sylwek's teacher
 Patrycja Soliman as journalist

References

External links
 

2006 films
2006 drama films
Polish drama films
Films about alcoholism
Fiction about substance abuse
Angels in popular culture
2000s Polish-language films